Srinagar is a city and municipal corporation  in Pauri Garhwal district in the Indian state of Uttarakhand. It is located about 33 km from Pauri town, the administrative headquarters of Pauri Garhwal district, Uttarakhand, India.

Geography
It has an average elevation of 560 metres (1,837 feet). It is the largest town in the Garhwal Hills. It is reached by national highway NH58 from Rishikesh, Srinagar is about 104 km from Rishikesh which is the last city on the plains of Uttarakhand and from where the mountains start. Srinagar can also be reached via Kotdwara, from Kotdwara it takes maximum 5 hours to reach there.It is a municipal board in the Pauri district of uttarakhand which is now upgraded to Municipal Corporation recently.

Demographics

As per the 2011 census, Srinagar had a population of 20,115. Males constituted 52% of the population and females 48%. Srinagar is the largest city in the Garhwal hills.

Geology
Srinagar city mainly rests over the Quaternary fluvial terraces of boulders and sand deposited by Alaknanda river. The hard rock under these boulder-sand terraces is the Proterozoic phyllite called Pauri Phyllite. This highly fractured Pauri Phyllite of Chandpur Formation (Jaunsar Group) is separated from the quartzite and limestone of Rudraprayag Formation by the North Almora Thrust (NAT), sometimes also called Srinagar Thrust.

History

Srinagar came into limelight after becoming the capital of Garhwal Kingdom. King Ajay Pal with unifying the various chiefdoms and garhis (small counties) of this region during 1506–1512 CE founded the Garhwal kingdom and shifted the capital to Srinagar place from Chandpur Garhi.

The Gorkhas defeated the Nepali king and occupied Kathmandu. This emboldened them and they turned westward and attacked Kumaon and Garhwal in 1803. Raja Pradyumna Shah of Garhwal was defeated and killed in January 1804. Srinagar was under Gorkha rule from 1806 to 1815 CE. After the Gorkhas were defeated by the British, Srinagar became a part of British Garhwal.

The old Srinagar city was destroyed in the  Gohna Lake dam-burst which destroyed all the old relics of the town.

Today the town is an important cultural and educational centre.  Being placed in central Garhwal at a moderate height, it is an important Valley Bazar in the hills.  It has a number of temples and monuments and places for tourists to stay and visit.

Climate
Srinagar's location in a valley flanked by high mountains means the city sees large annual temperature variations. Daytime high temperatures can exceed  between May and July, and the city sees the hottest summers of anywhere in the Garhwal Himalaya. On the coldest days of the year, which come mostly in December and January, the daytime high temperature sometimes does not exceed .

Education
Hemwati Nandan Bahuguna Garhwal University (renamed after Hemvati Nandan Bahuguna in 1989), established in 1973, is situated at Srinagar.  The University has jurisdiction over seven districts of the Garhwal region. It was made a Central University in 2009 by the Central Universities Act, 2009. It has two other teaching campuses at Pauri and Tehri towns. It is a residential cum affiliating institution of higher learning with more than 180 affiliated colleges.

National Institute of Technology, Uttarakhand opened in 2010.

Srinagar Base Hospital Medical college with MBBS and MS courses having more than 500 students, is also situated at Srikot about 5 km from Srinagar towards Joshimath.

One ITI and one Polytechnic along with one B.Ed. college are other educational institutes in Srinagar.

Sashastra Seema Bal (SSB) Cadets Training Academy is also operating here for long.It is now functioning as Centralised Training Center or CTC.

St. Theresa's School which is an English medium school situated near Alaknanda river. The School has been recognized by Council for Indian School Certificate Examinations since a long time.

Sri Guru Ram Rai(SGRR) is another popular school in Srinagar which located near Kamleshwar Mahadev Mandir. The School has been recognized by Central Board of Secondary Education.

There are many schools affiliated to CBSE, CISCE and UBSE Boards in the town which provide a versatile education system for all-round development.

The literacy rate of Srinagar city is 92.03% higher than the state average of 78.82%. In Srinagar, Male literacy is around 94.22% while the female literacy rate is 89.51%

Transportation

Railways

Till date Sri-Gadwall has nearest railway stations either at Kotdwara or at Rishikesh. But A Centre-State train project is undergone to link Char Dham of Gadwall. After finishing of project Sri Gadwall will have three consequent railway stations.
Sri-Kedar:
or Maletha-Janasu Railway station. 
Sri-Nagar:
or Naithana-Chauras Railway station.
Srikot:
or Sueet-Dhari Railway Station.

Politics

Governing Body
Srinagar is administered through a municipal corporation Sri Gadwall.

It is the 9th municipal corporation in Uttarakhand, 1st in hill region of Uttarakhand, 1st in Garhwal and Kumaon, and 1st in Pauri Garhwal district.

Sri Gadwall District(Proposed)

There is silent demand for making a separate district by carving Srinagar Tehsil of Pauri Garhwal District and Devaprayag Tehsil of Tehri Garhwal District, head quartered at Sri Gadwall (Srinagar-Kirtinagar Metrocity).
If the proposed district is made. Tehri Garhwal, Pauri Garhwal and Rudraprayag will be the adjoining districts of Sri Gadwall district.

Tourism

Religious Tourism

References

External links

 Srinagar Garhwal, Uttarakhand Himalayas
 Srinagar campus of HNBGU

Former capital cities in India
Cities and towns in Pauri Garhwal district
Uttarakhand